is located on the island of Okinoerabujima in the town of Wadomari, Ōshima District, Kagoshima Prefecture, Japan.

History
Okinoerabu Airport was opened on 1 May 1969 with a 1200-meter runway, and was officially certified as a third-class airport by the Japanese government on 31 May 1969. In order to handle operations by  Bombardier Q400 aircraft, the runway was reinforced and lengthened to 1400 meters on 12 May 2005. The last commercial operation of the NAMC YS-11 in Japan was on 30 September 2006 on a flight from Okenoerabu to Kagoshima.

Airlines and destinations

References

External links

 Okinoerabu Airport Guide Japan Airlines
 

Airports in Kagoshima Prefecture